Eva-Lena Karlsson (born 28 April 1961) is a Swedish cross-country skier. She competed in the women's 5 kilometres at the 1984 Winter Olympics. She is the older sister of cross-country skier Ann-Marie Karlsson, and the maternal aunt of Frida Karlsson.

Cross-country skiing results
All results are sourced from the International Ski Federation (FIS).

Olympic Games

World Championships

World Cup

Season standings

References

External links
 

1961 births
Living people
Swedish female cross-country skiers
Olympic cross-country skiers of Sweden
Cross-country skiers at the 1984 Winter Olympics
Sportspeople from Jönköping
20th-century Swedish women